Ota Kulhánek (born 23 July 1935) is a Czech seismologist who currently resides in Uppsala, Sweden, where he is emeritus professor of geophysics at Uppsala University.

He is also the author of the book Anatomy of Seismograms, released in 1990.

References 

Seismologists
Czechoslovak geologists
20th-century Swedish geologists
Czech emigrants to Sweden
Academic staff of Uppsala University
1935 births
Living people